Nesty "La Mente Maestra" (born Ernesto F. Padilla on September 5, 1973) is a Puerto Rican reggaeton music producer. He was closely associated with reggaeton duo Wisin & Yandel and reggaeton producer Víctor "El Nasi".

Music career
Nesty began his recording career as an associate of reggaeton hitmakers Luny Tunes during the early to mid-2000s. Known simply as Nesty, he made a name for himself apart from Luny Tunes with a pair of hit singles in 2005: "Chulin Culin Chunfly" (Voltio ft. Calle 13) and "Eso Ehh...!!" (Alexis & Fido).

In 2006, Nesty produced tracks for high-profile albums by Don Omar (King of Kings) and Tego Calderón (The Underdog/El Subestimado), including the hit single "Los Maté" by the latter. Around this same time, Nesty began a close association with Wisin & Yandel, producing much of their album Los Vaqueros, including the hit singles "Pegao," "Yo Te Quiero," and "Nadie Como Tú." In subsequent years he remained closely associated with Wisin & Yandel, producing the bulk of their album Wisin vs. Yandel: Los Extraterrestres, including the chart-topping hit single "Sexy Movimiento," and Wisin & Yandel Presentan: La Mente Maestra in which he was co-billed on the front cover of the latter album. On May 19 Nesty produced the re-edition of the album Los Vaqueros: El Regreso, named Reloaded.

In 2011 Nesty produced  (Alexis & Fido) "Contestame El Teléfono" and  "Donde Estés Llegaré"

Begin 2012, a few artists signed with WY Records decided to leave the record label. Among them were Franco "El Gorila", Tico "El Inmigrante" and Jayko. On January 19, it was announced that top-producer Nesty had also said goodbye to WY Records. He decided it was time to go separate ways and is about to start his own company. Rumoured albums like Tainy vs. Nesty and Nesty vs. Victor were hereby negated.

In 2015 Nesty produced several tracks for Alexis & Fido in La Esencia "Santa de mi Devocion"  and the Grammy Award-winning album and a nomination for BEST URBAN SONG "Dando Break".

2016 Nesty produced Alexis & Fido "Una en Un Millon", which was a Latin Grammy Award nominee.

In 2021, he worked with Yandel in a new single.

Discography
2008
Wisin & Yandel Presentan: La Mente Maestra; Compilation album by DJ Nesty and Wisin & Yandel

Production discography
2005
The Pitbulls; Studio album by Alexis & Fido
Voltio; Studio album by Julio Voltio
Vida Escante: Special Edition; Studio album by Nicky Jam

2006
Top of the Line;Studio album by Tito El Bambino
King of Kings; Studio album by Don Omar
Los Vaqueros; Compilation album by Wisin & Yandel

2007
Masterpiece Commemorative Edition; compilation album by R.K.M & Ken-Y
Los Vaqueros Wild Wild Mixes; Remix album by Wisin & Yandel
Wisin vs. Yandel: Los Extraterrestres; Studio album by Wisin & Yandel

2008
La Melodía De La Calle; Studio album by Tony Dize
Los Extraterrestres: Otra Dimension; Studio album by Wisin & Yandel

2009
Welcome to the Jungle; Studio album by Franco "El Gorila"
La Revolución; Studio album by Wisin & Yandel
2010
El Momento;Studio album by Jowell & Randy

2011
Los Vaqueros 2: El Regreso; Studio album by Wisin & Yandel

2013
Free Music; Studio album by Tempo

2014
Legacy; EP by Yandel

2015
El Que Sabe, Sabe;  by Tego Calderon Latin Grammy Winner
La Esencia; Studio album by Alexis y Fido

2018
La Resurreccion; Studio album by Yomo (up coming) Coming soon

References

Reggaeton record producers
Living people
1973 births
Latin music songwriters